Abedus herberti, the toe biter, is a species of giant water bug in the family Belostomatidae. It is found in Central America and North America.

Subspecies
These two subspecies belong to the species Abedus herberti:
 Abedus herberti herberti Hidalgo, 1935
 Abedus herberti utahensis Menke, 1960

References

External links

 

Belostomatidae
Articles created by Qbugbot
Insects described in 1935